The men's 110 metres hurdles at the 1938 European Athletics Championships was held in Paris, France, at Stade Olympique de Colombes on 4 September 1938.

Medalists

Results

Final
4 September

Heats
4 September

Heat 1

Heat 2

Heat 3

Participation
According to an unofficial count, 12 athletes from 9 countries participated in the event.

 (1)
 (2)
 (1)
 (1)
 (1)
 (1)
 (1)
 (2)
 (2)

References

110 metres hurdles
Sprint hurdles at the European Athletics Championships